The Glasford crater is a buried impact crater in southern Peoria County, Illinois, in the United States.

The Glasford crater was discovered by drilling wells for underground natural gas storage.

References 

Impact craters of the United States
Geology of Illinois
Silurian impact craters
Silurian Illinois
.craters
Landforms of Peoria County, Illinois
Landforms of Illinois